Ambesisika is a rural municipality in Madagascar. It belongs to the district of Ambato-Boeni, which is a part of Boeny Region. The population of the municipality was 15.000.

This municipality formerly belonged to Ambato Ambarimay, from which it had been split off in 2015.

References 

Populated places in Boeny